The Nicolet Centre River (in French: rivière Nicolet Centre) is a tributary on the west bank of the Nicolet Southwest River. It flows into the municipality of Wotton, in the Les Sources Regional County Municipality (MRC), in the administrative region of Estrie, in Quebec, in Canada.

Geography 

The main hydrographic slopes near the "Nicolet Center river" are:
 North side: Nicolet Northeast River, Nicolet River;
 East side: Nicolet River, Canard River, Saint-François River;
 South side Madeleine River (Les Sources), Nicolet Southwest River;
 West side: Nicolet Southwest River.

The "Nicolet Center River" takes its source from several mountain streams located south of Chemin des Anglais, west of Lake Louise, west of Saint-François River, south of Mont Ham and west of the village of Weedon.

The "Nicolet Center river" empties on the east bank of the Nicolet Southwest River, upstream from "Les Trois Lacs", upstream from the sixth range bridge and downstream from the route 255.

Toponymy 

The toponym "Rivière Nicolet Center" was made official on December 5, 1968, at the Commission de toponymie du Québec.

See also 
 Lake Saint-Pierre
 List of rivers of Quebec

References 

Rivers of Centre-du-Québec
Les Sources Regional County Municipality